The Yong'an dialect (Central Min: 永安事, Mandarin Chinese: 永安話) is a Central Min dialect spoken in Yong'an, Sanming in Western Fujian Province, China.

Phonology 
The Yong'an dialect has 17 initials, 41 rimes and 6 tones.

Initials 
The initials of the Yong'an dialect are:

 The initials  and  occur in free variation.
  can also be heard as voiced plosives  in free variation.
 Palato-alveolar sounds  can also be heard as alveolo-palatal sounds  in free variation among speakers.

Rimes 
The Yong'an dialect has a rich set of oral and nasal vowels, but allows only -m and -ŋ as a final consonant.

Tones 
The tones are:

Tone sandhi 
The Yong'an dialect has extremely extensive tone sandhi rules: in an utterance, only the last syllable pronounced is not affected by the rules. The two-syllable tonal sandhi rules are shown in the table below:

References 

 
 
 

Central Min